Cho Kwang-han (born 1 February 1958) is a South Korean politician serving as Mayor of Namyangju in Gyeonggi Province from 2018.

Previous political career 
He was previously an administrator at President Kim Dae-jung's Blue House. He then worked for Kim's successor Roh Moo-hyun. He was responsible for recruiting Jagalchi Market worker for televised speech in support of then-presidential candidate Roh which hit unusually high 12.4% viewer ratings. For this he was appointed by then-president Roh as his secretary for public relations and later vice spokesperson.

In 2012 general election, he unsuccessfully ran for Seoul's constituency under the slogan "I want to make Ahn Cheol-soo the president" but as an independent candidate to benchmark Ahn's "new politics campaign" as opposed to two-party system.

Mayor of Namyangju 
In 2018 election, Cho became the first Democratic politician to become the Mayor of Namyangju, which was taken by main opposition party, PPP, for 16 years, defeating former deputy governor of Gyeonggi Province. He earned the party nomination defeating the former deputy mayor of the city.

In October 2018, Cho launched the task force dedicated to eradicating businesses illegally selling extremely overpriced food and charging for bench usages at illegally installed restaurants around the major lakes in the city. In July 2019 the project was completed allowing citizens to enjoy cleaner lakes freely becoming the first in such project in the country. A month later Gyeonggi Province Governor Lee Jae-myung launched similar projects.

Education and Academia 
Cho holds a bachelor's degree in Chinese language from Hankuk University of Foreign Studies. He previously served as a visiting scholar at Georgetown University and an endowed chair professor at Kunjang University College.

Electoral history

References 

Living people
Minjoo Party of Korea politicians
1958 births
Hankuk University of Foreign Studies alumni
People from Gunsan
Mayors of places in South Korea
Namyangju